The Croatian National Theatre in Zagreb, commonly referred to as HNK Zagreb, is a theatre, opera and ballet house located in Zagreb.

Overview

The theatre evolved out of the first city theatre opened in 1834 housed in the present-day Old City Hall. The theatre was first established as the Croatian National Theatre in 1860, and in 1861 it gained government support putting it on par with many other European national theatres. In 1870 an opera company was added to the theatre and in 1895 it moved to the new purpose-built building on Republic of Croatia Square in Zagreb's Lower Town, where it is based today.

Austro-Hungarian emperor Franz Joseph I was at the unveiling of this new building during his visit to the city in 1895.
The building itself was the project of famed Viennese architects Ferdinand Fellner and Herman Helmer, whose firm had built several theatres in Vienna. Celebrations marking the 100th anniversary of the building were held on October 14, 1995.

At the entrance of the theatre is located the wall fountain The Source of Life (Zdenac života), designed by Croatian artist and sculptor Ivan Meštrović in 1905.

Many of Croatia's leading artist have worked at the theatre. Its first manager and dramatist was the Greek–Croatian poet Dimitrija Demeter, a leading activist of the Croatian national revival movement, with Ivan Zajc as first conductor. Jakov Gotovac was the Theatre's opera conductor from 1923 to 1958. The famous Croatian theatre director Branko Gavella began his career here, as did the first Croatian prima ballerina Mia Čorak Slavenska. A notable comic opera Ero s onoga svijeta premiered in this theatre in 1935.

The theatre has also seen many international artists including Franz Liszt, Sarah Bernhardt, Franz Lehár, Richard Strauss, Gérard Philipe, Vivien Leigh, Laurence Olivier, Jean-Louis Barrault, Peter Brook, Mario Del Monaco, José Carreras.

There are also Croatian National Theatres in Split, Rijeka, Osijek, Varaždin and Zadar.

Due to the ongoing coronavirus pandemic the Croatian National Theater in Zagreb decided, in collaboration with the daily newspaper 24sata, to allow citizens access quality cultural content through a YouTube channel, which will feature daily performances from the branches of opera, ballet and drama, and the viewers will be able to watch some of the most popular performances of the Theater, such as:
 One Song a Day Takes Mischief Away – 
 Swan lake – 
 Ero the Joker –

See also
History of Zagreb
History of Croatia
Croatian Academy of Sciences and Arts

References

External links

  

Theatres in Zagreb
Donji grad, Zagreb
National theatres
Opera houses in Croatia
1860 establishments in Croatia
Music venues completed in 1895
Theatres completed in 1895
1895 establishments in Croatia
Fellner & Helmer buildings
Neoclassical architecture in Croatia